Hemsley Fraser is a learning and development company, with offices in the UK (London and Saltash), the USA (Washington, D.C.) and Germany (Frankfurt). It provides training courses, digital and blended learning, consulting services and managed learning services. Founded in 1991, Hemsley Fraser operates in 50 countries and works with 36 percent of Fortune Global 500 corporations.

In 2008, Hemsley Fraser was acquired by France-based training group Demos. In 2016, Demos was acquired by China-based training and education group Weidong.

Learning and development portfolio 
 Hemsley Fraser provides 250 training courses, on leadership, management, personal effectiveness, project management, PA & secretary, marketing, purchasing, finance, HR, sales and service.
 In-house, blended and custom learning programmes.
 Digital and micro-learning content, including proprietary digital books and videos.
 Managed learning services/outsourcing.
 Consultancy on people management and learning & development issues.

Accreditations & Partnerships 
 Investors in People: Hemsley Fraser has the Investors in People Standard for achieving success through people. 
 Environmental management: Hemsley Fraser operates an Environmental Management System which complies with ISO 14001:2004.
 Chartered Management Institute
 The Institute of Leadership and Management
 Association for Project Management
 PRINCE2®
 MSP® Programme Management
 MoR® Management of Risk
 Member of the Agile Business Consortium Community

About the parent company Demos/Weidong 
Established in 1972 - and headquartered in Paris, France - Demos is a global provider of learning and development, with 650 employees and a network of 3,000 trainers.

Based in Beijing, China, Weidong Group provides online training for 130 million learners in 195 countries. It is UNESCO's first world partner in the field of education.

References

External links 
 Hemsley Fraser UK website
 Hemsley Fraser USA website
 Hemsley Fraser Germany website

Leadership training
Human resource management consulting firms
Consulting firms established in 1991